Dougher is a surname. Notable people with the surname include:

Leslie Dougher, American politician
Patrick Dougher, artist, musician, and art therapist
Sarah Dougher (born 1967), American singer-songwriter, author, and teacher

Surnames of Irish origin